"Willing to Forgive" is a song by American singer-songwriter Aretha Franklin from her seventh compilation album, Greatest Hits: 1980–1994 (1994). It was released as the album's second single in May 1994 by Arista Records. Written and produced by Babyface and Daryl Simmons, it became a hit in the, reaching number 26 on the Billboard Hot 100 and number five on the Billboard Hot R&B/Hip-Hop Songs chart. It also charted in the UK, reaching number 17. On the Eurochart Hot 100, "Willing to Forgive" peaked at number 49 in July 1994.

Critical reception
Jose F. Promis from AllMusic deemed the song an "assembly-line ballad". A reviewer from Billboard declared it as "superb" and "infectious". Dave Sholin from the Gavin Report commented, "Close to beginning her fourth decade as the reigning Queen Of Soul, it's a special song like this one, penned by Babyface and Daryl Simmons, that really allows Aretha to utilize her amazing vocal range. Her finest effort in many a moon should put her back on Top 40 in a big way." Another reviewers, Bill Speed and John Martinucci concluded with that the singer "presents "Willing To Forgive" tenderly but with the in-your-face honesty that has become her soulful trademark."

Pan-European magazine Music & Media wrote, "Whereas most contemporary dance singers give everything at the wrong time, Aretha wonderfully restrains herself on this entrancing ballad. It's all about dosing your vocal power." Alan Jones from Music Week stated, "A powerful R&B ballad draws a scorching performance from Aretha, whose commitment and attack do her credit." James Hamilton from the RM Dance Update described it as a "pleasant enough 76bpm radio ballad".

Charts

Weekly charts

Year-end charts

Release history

References

External links
 

1990s ballads
1994 singles
1994 songs
Aretha Franklin songs
Arista Records singles
Contemporary R&B ballads
Songs about infidelity
Songs written by Babyface (musician)
Songs written by Daryl Simmons